Haem or Heme carrier protein 1 (HCP1)  was originally identified as mediating heme-Fe transport although it later emerged that it was a folate transporter.

References

Human proteins